A tombolo is a sandy or shingle isthmus. A tombolo, from the Italian , meaning 'pillow' or 'cushion', and sometimes translated incorrectly as ayre (an ayre is a shingle beach of any kind), is a deposition landform by which an island becomes attached to the mainland by a narrow piece of land such as a spit or bar. Once attached, the island is then known as a tied island. 

Several islands tied together by bars which rise above the water level are called a tombolo cluster.  Two or more tombolos may form an enclosure (called a lagoon) that can eventually fill with sediment.

Formation

The shoreline moves toward the island (or detached breakwater) due to accretion of sand in the lee of the island, where wave energy and longshore drift are reduced and therefore deposition of sand occurs.

Wave diffraction and refraction
True tombolos are formed by wave refraction and diffraction. As waves near an island, they are slowed by the shallow water surrounding it. These waves then bend around the island to the opposite side as they approach. The wave pattern created by this water movement causes a convergence of longshore drift on the opposite side of the island. The beach sediments that are moving by lateral transport on the lee side of the island will accumulate there, conforming to the shape of the wave pattern. In other words, the waves sweep sediment together from both sides. Eventually, when enough sediment has built up, the beach shoreline, known as a spit, will connect with an island and form a tombolo.

Unidirectional longshore drift 
In the case of longshore drift due to an oblique wave direction, like at Chesil Beach or Spurn Head, the flow of material is along the coast in a movement which is not determined by wave diffraction around the now tied island, such as the Isle of Portland, which it has reached. In this and similar cases like Cádiz, while the strip of beach material connected to the island may be technically called a tombolo because it links the island to the land, it is better thought of in terms of its formation as a spit, because the sand or shingle ridge is parallel rather than at right angles to the coast.

Morphology and sediment distribution

Tombolos demonstrate the sensitivity of shorelines. A small piece of land, such as an island, or a beached shipwreck can change the way that waves move, leading to different deposition of sediments.
Sea level rise may also contribute to accretion, as material is pushed up with rising sea levels.
Tombolos are more prone to natural fluctuations of profile and area as a result of tidal and weather events than a normal beach is. Because of this susceptibility to weathering, tombolos are sometimes made more sturdy through the construction of roads or parking lots. The sediments that make up a tombolo are coarser towards the bottom and finer towards the surface. It is easy to see this pattern when the waves are destructive and wash away finer grained material at the top, revealing coarser sands and cobbles as the base.

Examples

 Adam's Bridge (until 1480), between India and Sri Lanka
 Aupouri Peninsula, New Zealand
 Barrenjoey Headland, Pittwater, New South Wales, Australia
 Beavertail Point, Conanicut Island, Rhode Island, United States
 Bennett Island, De Long Group, Russia
 Biddeford Pool, Maine, United States
 Bijia Mountain, China
 Bruny Island, Tasmania, Australia
 Burgh Island, Devon, England
 Cádiz, Andalucía, Spain
 Chausey, Manche département, France (two features connecting the main island and two smaller outcrops)
 Chappaquiddick Island, Martha's Vineyard, Massachusetts, United States
 Charles Island, Connecticut, United States
 Chesil Beach, Portland, Dorset, England
 Cheung Chau, Hong Kong
 Crimea, Ukraine
 Eaglehawk Neck, Tasmania, Australia
 S'Espalmador, Formentera, Spain
 Fingal Bay, New South Wales, Australia
 The Rock of Gibraltar
 Grand Island National Recreation Area, Michigan, United States
 Gugh, St Agnes, Isles of Scilly, England
 Gwadar, Pakistan
 Hakodate, Hokkaido, Japan
 Howth Head, Dublin, Ireland
 Inishkeel Island, Narin, Ireland
 Kapıdağ Peninsula, Balıkesir, Turkey
 Knappelskär, Nynäshamn, Sweden
 Konet Island, Kuala Sungai Baru, Malacca,  Malaysia
 Kurnell, Sydney, New South Wales, Australia
 Lake Pomorie, Bulgaria
 Langness, Derbyhaven, Isle of Man
 Las Palmas de Gran Canaria, Canary Islands, Spain
 Little Heart's Ease, Newfoundland and Labrador beach, Newfoundland Canada
 Llandudno, North Wales
 Louds Island at Muscongus Bay, Maine, United States
 Maharees, Dingle Peninsula, Ireland
 Mare Island,  Vallejo, California, United States
 Maria Island, Tasmania
 Maury Island, Washington, United States
 McMicken Island State Park,  Washington, United States
 Miquelon, Saint-Pierre and Miquelon, France
 Monemvasia, Laconia, Peloponnese, Greece
 Monte Argentario, Tuscany, Italy
 Mont-Saint-Michel, Normandy, France
 Moses' Pass (Whale Tail), Ballena National Marine Park, Uvita, Costa Rica
 Mount Maunganui, New Zealand
 Mount Taipingot, Rota, Northern Marianas
 Nahant, Massachusetts, United States (a natural tombolo, but connected to the mainland by a causeway)
 Nissi beach, Ayia Napa, Cyprus
 Ormara, Pakistan
 Palisadoes, Kingston, Jamaica
 Peniche, Portugal
 Peniscola, Castellon, Spain
 Porchat Island, Itararé Beach, São Vicente, Brazil
 Presqu'ile Provincial Park, Ontario, Canada
 Presque Isle, Michigan, United States
 Presqu'ile de Giens, Hyères, France
 Quiberon, France
 Sainte-Marie, Martinique, France
 Scotts Head, Dominica
 Shaman's Island, Douglas, Alaska, United States
 Sharp Island, Sai Kung District, Hong Kong
 Silver Strand (San Diego),  Coronado, California, United States
 St Michael's Mount, Cornwall, England
 St Ninian's Isle, Shetland Islands, Scotland
 Sveti Stefan, near Budva, Montenegro
 Tam Hai, Quang Nam province, Vietnam
 University Beach, Ward Island, Corpus Christi, Texas, United States
 Uummannaq in North Star Bay, Greenland
 Vatersay, Scotland – the island comprises two sections connected by a broad tombolo
 Zhifu Island, Yantai, China 

Some of these may be simple isthmus, and not have the deposition creation that defines a true tombolo.

See also

 Ayre (landform)
 Bar
 Causeway
 Cuspate foreland
 Isthmus
 Tied island
 Shoal

References

External links 

 Geology.About.com's page on tombolos (useful for its descriptive photograph)
 Tombolo in Sainte-Marie, Martinique (useful for its photos and description)
 further reading on Detached breakwaters from Vlaams Instituut voor de Zee in Belgium
 further reading on coastal structures from Prof. Leo van Rijn in Holland

Coastal and oceanic landforms
Coastal geography
 Tombolo
Oceanographical terminology